The following is an alphabetical list of articles related to the United States Territory of Guam.

0–9

.gu – Internet country code top-level domain for Guam

A
Airports in Guam
Area code 671
Atlas of Guam

B
Birds of Guam
Buildings and structures in Guam
commons:Category:Buildings and structures in Guam

C

Capital of Guam
Chamorro people
:Category:Chamorro
commons:Category:Chamorro
Cities in Guam
Climate of Guam
Coat of Arms of Guam
Cocos Island
Colleges and universities in Guam
University of Guam
Guam Community College
commons:Category:Universities and colleges in Guam
Communications in Guam
Constitution of Guam
Culture of Guam
Cyclones in Guam

D
Delegates to the United States House of Representatives from Guam
Demographics of Guam

E
Economy of Guam
:Category:Economy of Guam
commons:Category:Economy of Guam
Education in Guam
commons:Category:Education in Guam
Elections in Guam
:Category:Elections in Guam
Energy in Guam
Environment of Guam
commons:Category:Environment of Guam

F

Fanohge Chamoru (Stand Ye Guamanians)
Flag of Guam

G
Geography of Guam
:Category:Geography of Guam
commons:Category:Geography of Guam
Government of the Territory of Guam  (website)
Governor of the Territory of Guam
List of governors of Guam
GU – United States Postal Service postal code for the Territory of Guam
Guam  (website)
:Category:Guam
commons:Category:Guam
commons:Category:Maps of Guam
Guam Police Department
Guam Public School System
Gun laws in Guam

H
Hagåtña, Guam, capital since 1668
Higher education in Guam
History of Guam
Historical outline of Guam
:Category:History of Guam
commons:Category:History of Guam

I
Images of Guam
Islands of Guam
Cocos Island
Guam

L
Languages of Guam
Law enforcement in Guam
Lists related to Guam:
List of airports in Guam
List of birds of Guam
List of cities in Guam
List of colleges and universities in Guam
List of delegates to the United States House of Representatives from Guam
List of governors of Guam
List of Guam-related topics
List of islands of Guam
List of newspapers in Guam
List of political parties in Guam
List of radio stations in Guam
List of Registered Historic Places in Guam
List of rivers of Guam
List of schools in Guam
List of Superfund sites in Guam
List of television stations in Guam
List of villages of Guam
List of wettest known tropical cyclones in Guam
 Vehicle registration plates of Guam

M
Mariana Islands
Micronesia
Micronesia challenge
Military in Guam
Music of Guam

N
Newspapers in Guam
Mariana Islands

P
Pacific Basin Development Council
List of people from Guam
Politics of Guam
List of political parties in Guam
:Category:Politics of Guam
commons:Category:Politics of Guam
Postage stamps and postal history of Guam

R
Radio stations in Guam
Registered historic places in Guam
commons:Category:Registered Historic Places in Guam
Religion in Guam
Rivers of Guam

S
Schools in Guam
Scouting in Guam
Society of Guam
commons:Category:Guam society
Sports in Guam
commons:Category:Sports in Guam
Superfund sites in Guam

T
Telecommunications in Guam
Telephone area code 671
Television stations in Guam
Territory of Guam  (website)
Constitution of Guam
Government of the Territory of Guam
List of Guam Governors
Supreme Court of Guam
Villages of Guam
Topic outline of Guam
Tourism in Guam  (website )
commons:Category:Tourism in Guam
Transportation in Guam
Tropical cyclones in Guam
:Category:Typhoons in Guam

U
Underwater diving on Guam
United States of America
Guam's at-large congressional district
List of Delegates to the United States House of Representatives from Guam
Political divisions of the United States
United States Court of Appeals for the Ninth Circuit
United States District Court for the District of Guam
Universities and colleges in Guam
University of Guam
Guam Community College
commons:Category:Universities and colleges in Guam

V
Villages of Guam

W
Wikimedia
Wikimedia Commons Atlas of Guam
Wikimedia Commons Category:Guam
commons:Category:Maps of Guam
Wikinews:Category:Guam
Wikinews:Portal:Guam
Wikipedia Category:Guam
Wikipedia:WikiProject Micronesia/Guam work group
Wikipedia:WikiProject Micronesia/Guam work group#Recognized content
Wikipedia:WikiProject Micronesia/Guam work group#Participants
Wikipedia:WikiProject Topic outline/Drafts/Topic outline of Guam

Z
Zen Habits, blog by a writer from Guam

See also

Topic overview:
Guam
Outline of Guam

External links

 
Guam